John Frieda (born Alan Howard Frieda, 9 July 1951) is a British celebrity hairstylist and founder of hair salon and hair product businesses. The hair product business was acquired in 2002 by Kao Corporation, Japan.

Early life
Frieda was born in London. His father was Isidore Frieda, a hairdressing salon and property owner, and his mother was Hannah Mary Docherty. He has three siblings, including Nigel Frieda, a music producer, and the owner of Osea Island, Essex.

Frieda attended private school, King's School, Harrow, and worked part-time at his father's salon as a high school student. Isidore mentored John and invested in his early ventures.

Career
In 1988 at the age of 37, Frieda moved to the United States (New York) for 12 years and collaborated with Gail Federici to create different hair products for blondes and brunettes and the Frizz Ease products.

Personal life
From 1977 until 1991, Frieda was married to Scottish pop singer and actress Lulu and together they had a son, actor Jordan Frieda.

He later married Avery Agnelli, widow of the Fiat heir Giovanni Alberto Agnelli, with whom he has his two children and a stepdaughter.

References

External links
 Official website (UK)

1951 births
Living people
British hairdressers
English Jews
Businesspeople from London
Conservative Party (UK) people